Sultanpur is a Gram panchayat in hajipur, vaishali district, bihar.

Geography
This panchayat is located at

Panchayat office
Samudayik bhawan Mohabatpur

Nearest City/Town
Hajipur (Distance 4 km)

Nearest major road highway or river
NH 103 (National highway 103)
NH 19 (National highway 19 )
OTHER ROADWAY

compass

Villages in panchayat
There are  villages in this panchayat

References

Gram panchayats in Bihar
Villages in Vaishali district
Vaishali district
Hajipur